"Unappreciated" is a R&B song by the girl group Cherish. It is the second single to be released off their debut album, Unappreciated. The single was released in 2006. It was produced by Jazze Pha. The single charted on various countdowns. It peaked at number 41 on the Billboard Hot 100. It charted more successfully on the Billboard Hot R&B/Hip-Hop Songs and Hot R&B/Hip-Hop Airplay charts at number 14. It charted on one video countdown, BET's 106 & Park, where it debuted at number 10 on October 12, 2006. On November 7, 2006, the single jumped from number 10 to number 5 and was named a "Monster move" on the channel. It peaked at number 2 on the countdown.

Song information
"Unappreciated" was written by two of the four members of Cherish. The writers are the older members of the group, Farrah, 30, and Neosha, 29.

The song is about a relationship between a male and female that is not going well. The female is feeling unappreciated and does not get the treatment that she wants. She claims that the male is taking her love for granted and will not say he loves her anymore.

Commercial performance
"Unappreciated" debuted at number 98 on US Billboard Hot 100 for the week of October 14, 2006. It peaked at number 41 for the week of December 16, 2006. It stayed on the chart for seventeen weeks.

Music video
Directed by Erik White, the video starts off with the four sisters on the front steps of their houses singing along to the chorus. Fallon of the group sings the first verse while walking in the neighborhood. The second verse is sung by the oldest member Farrah who is in her house on the couch singing. The last verse is sung by  Felisha where she is in front of a car, they are all on top of a house roof singing in the last scene.

Remix
The official remix was produced by Don Vito and featured rapper Da Brat.

Charts

Versions
"Unappreciated" (Edison Vocal Remix)
"Unappreciated : Sunship Mixes"

References

2005 songs
2006 singles
2000s ballads
Cherish (group) songs
Capitol Records singles
Contemporary R&B ballads
Music videos directed by Erik White
Song recordings produced by Jazze Pha
Songs written by Jazze Pha